Izquierda Mirandesa (IM) is a Spanish political party from the city of Miranda de Ebro (province of Burgos).
The actual leader of the party is Conchi Salazar.

Ideology
The ideology of the party is the left-wing Basque nationalism. Miranda de Ebro is now part of the province of Burgos, but, according to the party, the city should be  part of Álava and Euskadi.

History
The party was created by ex-members of the Workers' Party in 1983.

This party did not  participate in the 2007 local elections in Miranda de Ebro, but they advised the people from the city living in places where another party, Basque Nationalist Action (ANV), was going to participate, they should vote for them. In the local elections of 2015 the party gained one town councillor and the 6,16% of the vote.

References

External links
 Official facebook page.
 Official Twitter.

Socialist parties in the Basque Country (autonomous community)
Miranda de Ebro